Shimoga Institute of Medical Sciences (SIMS) is a medical college in Shimoga, Karnataka, India which was established in 2005. It is located on the Bangalore-Honnavar highway (NH-207) in Shimoga.

References

External links
 SIMS on Wikimapia

Medical colleges in Karnataka
Educational institutions established in 2005
Education in Shimoga
Universities and colleges in Shimoga district
2005 establishments in Karnataka